Contactin 6 is a protein in humans that is encoded by the CNTN6 gene.

The protein encoded by this gene is a member of the immunoglobulin superfamily. It is a glycosylphosphatidylinositol (GPI)-anchored neuronal membrane protein that functions as a cell adhesion molecule. It may play a role in the formation of axon connections in the developing nervous system.

References

Further reading

External links